Algernon Graves (London 1845–1922 London) was a British art historian and art dealer, who specialised in the documentation of the exhibition and sale of works of art. He created reference sources that began the modern discipline of provenance research.

Early life
Algernon Graves was born in Pall Mall, Westminster, the son of Henry Graves (1806–1892) a publisher of prints, and Mary Squire (d. 1871).

Graves studied German in Bonn, Germany, before working for his father's company Henry Graves & Co., researching for catalogues that the company published.

Career
During a period of recovery following an injury, Graves had the idea of creating a catalog of art that was exhibited in London, from his extensive lists of artists and their works that he had compiled while working on other projects.

In 1884 he published the first edition of his idea, entitled "A Dictionary of Artists who have Exhibited Works in the Principal London Exhibitions from 1760 to 1880".  A second edition followed in 1885 and a third in 1901.  In 1899, Graves and William V. Cronin issued the first volume of their work on Sir Joshua Reynolds, which they sold by subscription. In 1900, a book on Sir Thomas Lawrence by Lord Ronald Gower included a catalogue by Graves.

When his father Henry died in 1892, Algernon took over the running of Henry Graves & Company, where he worked until he retired in 1907.

Personal life
Graves married the daughter of an art dealer, John Clowes Grundy from Manchester, England and they had a son, Herbert Seymour Graves, who later assisted Graves with later editions of the Dictionary of Artists series.  His son died in 1898.

Graves remarried in 1919 to Madeline Lilian Sophia Wakeling Walker.

Later life
Graves died in Marylebone, in 1922 and is buried at Brompton Cemetery, London.

Publications

 Volume 1: Abbayne to Carrington; Vol. II Carroll to Dyer; Vol. III Eadie to Harraden; Vol. IV Harral to Lawranson; Vol. V Lawrence to Nye; Vol. VI Oakes to Rymsdyk; Vol. VII Sacco to Tofano; Vol. VIII Toft to Zwecker

 "British Institution, 1806–1867" (1908)
 "Summary of and Index to Waagen" (1912)
 "A Century of Loan Exhibitions, 1813–1912" (1913)
 "Art Sales from Early in the Eighteenth Century to Early in the Twentieth Century" (1918 to 1921)

References

 Dictionary of Art Historians Algernon Graves

External links
The Royal Academy of Arts; a complete dictionary of contributors and their works from its foundation in 1769 to 1904, by Algernon Graves, hathitrust.org

1845 births
1922 deaths
Burials at Brompton Cemetery
People from the City of Westminster
English art historians